"Rocky Mountain High" is a folk rock song written by John Denver and Mike Taylor and is one of the two official state songs of Colorado. Recorded by Denver in 1972 it is the title track of the 1972 album Rocky Mountain High and rose to No. 9 on the US Hot 100 in 1973. Denver told concert audiences in the mid-1970s that the song took him an unusually long nine months to write. On April 10, 2017, the record was certified Gold by the Recording Industry Association of America for sales exceeding 500,000 digital downloads.

Members of the Western Writers of America chose it as one of the Top 100 Western songs of all time.

Background and writing
"Rocky Mountain High" was primarily inspired by John Denver's move to Aspen, Colorado, three years before its writing and by his love for the state. The seventh stanza makes reference to the destruction of the mountains' beauty by commercial tourism. The song was considered a major piece of 1970’s pop culture and became a well-associated piece of Colorado history.

The song briefly became controversial that year when the U.S. Federal Communications Commission was permitted by a legal ruling to censor music deemed to promote drug abuse. Numerous radio stations cautiously banned it until Denver publicly explained that the "high" was his innocent description of the sense of peace he found in the Rockies. In 1985, Denver testified before Congress in the Parents Music Resource Center hearings about his experience:

Cash Box said that the song "sparkles with sincerity and beautiful lyrical images."

In popular culture
After years as an unofficial anthem for Colorado, on March 12, 2007, the Colorado General Assembly made "Rocky Mountain High" one of two official state songs, sharing the honor with "Where the Columbines Grow".

In late 2007, the John Denver Sanctuary in Aspen drew some controversy after the last lines of the song were removed from the "Rocky Mountain High" stone.

The song was also heard in "Final Destination" as a sign which was heard before each character dies.

American singer-songwriter Lana Del Rey referenced "Rocky Mountain High" in her 2023 single "The Grants".

Chart performance

References 

1972 songs
1972 singles
John Denver songs
Songs about Colorado
Music of Colorado
Symbols of Colorado
Colorado
Songs written by John Denver
Song recordings produced by Milt Okun
RCA Victor singles
Environmental songs
Songs about mountains